Futbol Club Barcelona Femení B is a Spanish football team based in Barcelona, in the autonomous community of Catalonia.

Founded in 2000, it is the reserve team of FC Barcelona Femení, and currently plays in Primera Federación, playing their home matches at the Ciutat Esportiva Joan Gamper.

Reserve teams in Spain play in the same league system as the senior team, rather than in a reserve team league. They must play at least one level below their main side, and thus Barcelona Femení B are ineligible for promotion to Primera División and cannot play in the Copa de la Reina.

History 

Barcelona Femeni B had to withdraw from Primera Nacional Femenina during 2007–2008 season because of the relegation of the first team, but they returned in the next season after Barcelona Femení was promoted back to the Superliga Femenina. In 2016 they became the champions in the group III of Segunda División for the first time in the history of the club. In September 2016 a record seven players from FCB Femeni B were called up to play for Spain's national youth team in 2016 FIFA U-17 Women's World Cup compared to five players in 2014 and two players in 2010. The team managed to reach the third place in the tournament.

Current squad

Current technical staff

Transfers

Season to season

Juvenil-Cadet squad

See also 
 :Category:FC Barcelona Femení B players

References

External links 
 Official Club Website

Spanish reserve football teams
2000 establishments in Catalonia
Football clubs in Barcelona
FC Barcelona
Women's football clubs in Spain
Segunda Federación (women) clubs
Association football clubs established in 2000
Primera Federación (women) clubs